Will Connors (born 4 April 1996) is an Irish rugby union player for Pro14 and European Rugby Champions Cup side Leinster, and for the Ireland national rugby union team. He plays in the back-row, primarily as an flanker.

Early life
Connors was born in Donadea, County Kildare and attended Clongowes Wood College, where he played on the school's Leinster Schools Rugby Senior Cup side. He had previously played for many years with North Kildare RFC minis and is now club ambassador for the North Kildare RFC Skylarks additional needs team.

Leinster
Connors spent a year in the Leinster Rugby sub-academy after leaving school in 2015, before entering the academy in Summer 2016. He impressed in making his senior debut in the 2017–18 season and was promoted to the senior squad ahead of the 2018–19 season (after completing two of the usual three academy years). Connors performances earned him a spot on the 2019–20 Pro14 Dream Team.

Ireland
Connors played for Ireland Under-20s in 2016. He has also featured for the Ireland 7s team.

Connors debuted for the Ireland national rugby union team on 24 October 2020 in a Six Nations fixture against Italy, where he scored a try and had a team-high 20 tackles, earning the man-of-the-match honor for his performance. In the 2021 Six Nations Connors scored another two tries against Italy.

References

External links

Leinster Profile
Pro14 Profile

1996 births
Living people
People educated at Clongowes Wood College
Rugby union players from County Kildare
Irish rugby union players
University College Dublin R.F.C. players
Leinster Rugby players
Rugby union flankers
Ireland international rugby union players